To Aroma Tis Amartias (Greek: Το Άρωμα της Αμαρτίας; English: The scent of sin) is the 12th studio album by Greek singer-songwriter and record producer Nikos Karvelas, released by Sony Music Greece in May 1996. The album was certified platinum with sales of 40,000 copies.

Track listing

External links 
 Official site

1996 albums
Albums produced by Nikos Karvelas
Greek-language albums
Nikos Karvelas albums
Sony Music Greece albums